Erasmus (1466–1536) was a Dutch humanist scholar.

Erasmus may also refer to:

Arts and entertainment
 Erasmus (Dune), a fictional robot in the Legends of Dune series by Kevin J. Anderson and Brian Herbert
 Erasmus, a character in the Quest for Glory video games
 Erasmus, a character in the 2003 film Barbie of Swan Lake
 Erasmus, a fictional ship in the 1975 novel Shōgun by James Clavell
 "Erasmus", a 2008 song by You Am I from Dilettantes

Education
 Erasmus+, a European Commission programme for education, training, youth, and sport
 Erasmus Brussels University of Applied Sciences and Arts
 Erasmus Hall High School, Brooklyn, New York
 Erasmus Programme, a European Union student exchange program
 Erasmus University Rotterdam
 Gymnasium Erasmianum, Rotterdam

Other uses
 Erasmus (train), an express train between The Hague and Munich 1973–2000
 Erasmus Bridge, or Erasmusbrug, a bridge in Rotterdam
 Erasmus Hospital, an academic hospital in Brussels associated with Free University of Brussels
 Erasmus metro station, in Brussels
 Erasmus Prize, an annual prize awarded by the Praemium Erasmianum Foundation
 7907 Erasmus, a main-belt asteroid

People

Given name
 Erasmus of Formiae (died c. 303), Christian saint and martyr
 Erasme Louis Surlet de Chokier (1769–1839), Belgian politician
 Erasmus of Arcadia (fl. 18th century), Greek Orthodox bishop
 Erasmus of Lueg (fl. 15th century), Slovenian robber baron, famed for being besieged in Predjama Castle
 Erasmus Darwin (1731–1802), English physician and poet, grandfather of Charles Darwin
 Erasmus Alvey Darwin (1804–1881), brother of Charles Darwin
 Erasmus Darwin IV (1881–1915), son of Horace Darwin, grandson of Charles Darwin
 Erasmus Gower (1742–1814), British naval officer and colonial governor
 Erasmus Grasser (c. 1450–c. 1515), German master builder and sculptor
 Erasmus James (born 1982), American professional football player
 Erasmus D. Keyes (1810–1895), American businessman, banker, and general
 Erasmus Reinhold (1511–1553), German astronomer and mathematician
 Erasmus Richardson (1810–1892), American politician
 Erasmus Smith (1611–1691), English merchant, landowner, and philanthropist

Surname
 Alan Erasmus (born 1949), British actor and co-founder of Factory Records in Manchester
 Daniel Erasmus, South African Paralympic athlete
 Daniel Erasmus (cricketer) (born 1973), Zimbabwean cricketer
 Daniel Jacobus Erasmus (1830–1913), South African Boer political figure
 Douglas Erasmus (born 1990), South African swimmer
 Frans Erasmus (1896–1967), South African politician
 Georges Erasmus (born 1948), Canadian politician
 Jaco Erasmus (born 1979), Italian rugby union player
 Kermit Erasmus (born 1990), South African football player
 Marais Erasmus (born 1974), South African cricket umpire
 Rassie Erasmus (born 1972), South African rugby union coach and former player

See also
 Gerasimos
 Rasmus (disambiguation)
 Elmo (given name), a derivative of Erasmus